Robert N. Cavarra (February 23, 1934 - February 8, 2008) was an American composer, organist, harpsichordist, pianist and musicologist who taught at Colorado State University from 1963 to 2000. According to the Denver Post, he was "a leading participant in the revival of the classical organ tradition in North America."

References

1934 births
2008 deaths
People from Denver
University of Colorado Boulder alumni
Colorado State University faculty
American composers
American harpsichordists
American organists
American pianists
20th-century American musicologists